Kocaoluk is a village in Silifke district of Mersin Province, Turkey. At  it is situated in Toros Mountains to the west of Limonlu Creek valley . The population of Kocaoluk was 311  as of 2011.

References

Villages in Silifke District